Tissi is a comune (municipality) in the Province of Sassari in the Italian region Sardinia, located about  northwest of Cagliari and about  south of Sassari.

Tissi borders the following municipalities: Ossi, Sassari, Usini.

Demographic evolution

References

External links

 www.comune.tissi.ss.it/

Cities and towns in Sardinia